Stirling and Falkirk is a lieutenancy area of Scotland. It consists of the local government areas of Stirling and Falkirk,
which cover the same areas as the previous districts from 1975 to 1996.

References
 The Lord-Lieutenants (Scotland) Order 1996, Statutory Instrument 1996 No. 731 (S.83).

Lieutenancy areas of Scotland
Falkirk (council area)
Stirling (council area)